Jo Jung-chi (born August 25, 1978) is a South Korean singer-songwriter and actor. He is best known for starring in the reality TV show We Got Married 4 alongside his now real-life wife, singer Choi Jung-in, in 2013.

Personal life 
After dating for eleven years, Jo married Choi Jung-in in 2013. They welcomed their first child, a daughter, in February 2017. Their second child, a son, was born in December 2019.

Discography

Studio albums

Singles

Filmography

Television   shows

Television series

Film

References

1978 births
Living people
Mystic Entertainment artists
South Korean male television actors
South Korean pop singers
South Korean guitarists
South Korean television personalities
21st-century South Korean  male singers
21st-century guitarists